Strippergate may refer to:
 Strippergate (Canada)
 Strippergate (Seattle)
 2015 University of Louisville basketball sex scandal, in which a team staffer was found to have paid large amounts for adult entertainment for players and recruits
 Operation G-Sting, an FBI investigation into bribes and unreported campaign contributions in Nevada and California
 Strippergate, a scandal that led to the resignation of Canadian Minister of Citizenship and Immigration Judy Sgro